The Washington secretary of state election, 2000, took place on November 7, 1992. Republican Sam Reed was elected to succeed incumbent Ralph Munro who did not seek re-election.

Primary election

The primary election took place in September.

Leading contenders for the Republican nomination were Thurston County Auditor Sam Reed and Mike Wensman, a member of the Washington House of Representatives. Perennial candidate Will Baker and political newcomer James Findley of Wilkeson also sought the GOP nomination. During the primary contest Wensman, who was independently wealthy and largely self-financed his campaign, purchased television ads, marking the first time TV advertising had been used in a secretary of state race in the history of Washington. Nonetheless, Sam Reed - who had been endorsed by the outgoing Munro - coasted to victory in the primary.

The Democratic nomination was sought by Washington State Democratic Party chairman Charles Rolland, former member of the U.S. House of Representatives Don Bonker, and Snohomish County Auditor Bob Terwilliger. Allen Norman of Seattle and Rand Daley of Olympia also vied for the nomination, which was ultimately won by Bonker.

J. Bradley Gibson and Chris Loftis faced no opposition in their primary election contests as candidates of the Libertarian Party and Reform Party, respectively.

General election
The general election was a close race, with Reed only eking out a victory over Bonker, despite outspending his opponent by a factor of nearly four to one. It was the ninth consecutive election for Washington secretary of state won by Republicans in the Democratic-leaning state.

References

secretary of state
2000
2000 United States state secretary of state elections